Richard Bowen may refer to:

Richard Bowen (Royal Navy officer) (1761–1797), British officer
Richard L. Bowen (born 1933), American university president
Richard M. Bowen III, American banker
Richard Bowen (bowls) (born 1957), Welsh lawn bowler